Ludwig Laher (born 11 December 1955 in Linz) is an Austrian writer.

Life
Ludwig Laher studied German, English and American Studies, as well as Classical Studies and graduated with a PhD. He then worked as a high school teacher at the Christian-Dopper high school in Salzburg, Austria.
In 1993, Laher moved to St. Pantaleon, Upper Austria and has worked as an independent writer since 1998. He has published prose, lyrical poetry, essays, translations, scientific papers, radio plays and screenplays and received numerous literary prizes and scholarships.

His novel Heart Flesh Degeneration has been praised by critics as well as by historians.

External links

1955 births
Living people
People from Braunau am Inn
Austrian essayists
21st-century Austrian novelists
Austrian male novelists
Austrian screenwriters
Austrian radio writers
Austrian translators
Austrian male poets
German-language writers
Austrian male screenwriters
Male essayists
21st-century essayists
21st-century male writers
21st-century screenwriters
21st-century translators